Union Township is one of twelve townships in White County, Indiana, United States. As of the 2010 census, its population was 9,906 and it contained 4,989 housing units.

Union Township was organized in 1834.

Geography

Cities, towns, villages
 Monticello
 Norway

Unincorporated towns
 Cedar Point at 
 East Monticello at 
 Golden Hill at 
 Guernsey at 
 Indiana Beach at 
(This list is based on USGS data and may include former settlements.)

Adjacent townships
 Liberty Township (north)
 Lincoln Township (east)
 Jefferson Township, Carroll County (southeast)
 Big Creek Township (southwest)
 Honey Creek Township (west)
 Monon Township (northwest)

Cemeteries
The township contains these two cemeteries: Cutler and River View.

Airports and landing strips
 Dittman Airport
 White County Airport

Rivers
 Tippecanoe River

Landmarks
 Monticello City Park
 The White County Asylum was listed on the National Register of Historic Places in 2010.

Education
 Twin Lakes School Corporation

Union Township is served by the Monticello-Union Township Public Library.

Political districts
 Indiana's 4th congressional district
 State House District 15
 State House District 16
 State Senate District 07

References
 United States Census Bureau 2007 TIGER/Line Shapefiles
 United States Board on Geographic Names (GNIS)
 IndianaMap

External links
 Indiana Township Association
 United Township Association of Indiana

Townships in White County, Indiana
Townships in Indiana